Escuer is a locality located in the municipality of Biescas, in Huesca province, Aragon, Spain. As of 2020, it has a population of 33.

Geography 
Escuer is located 61km north of Huesca.

References

Populated places in the Province of Huesca